Jada is a 2019 Indian Tamil-language sports horror film. The film stars Kathir and Roshini Prakash, while Kishore and Yogi Babu play supporting roles.

Plot 
Jada (Kathir) is a fearless young football player in North Chennai. His coach tells him to play well so that he can get selected in Santhosh Trophy and eventually secure a job in sports quota. But Jada wants to avenge the death of his childhood football hero Sethu (Kishore) who died in the violent 7s football. The local government has banned the 7s football but the neighborhood football committee lifts the ban after ten years. Now Jada and his teammates enroll in the 7s football tournament

Cast

Production 
The film was announced by debutant director Kumaran with the concept of sports based film with the lead actor Kathir playing the role of a footballer. The filmmakers hired Kathir in the male lead role after his breakthrough performance in the film Pariyerum Perumal and newcomer Roshini in the female lead role.

Soundtrack 

Soundtrack was composed by Sam C. S.
"Apdi Paakadhadi" – Anirudh Ravichander, Swagatha S. Krishnan
"Olamikka" – Sathyaprakash
"Tarrake" – Benny Dayal

Reception 
Times of India wrote "Having set up a predictable, but decent premise in the beginning, the screenplay goes downhill in the second half". Sify wrote "Tamil cinema has come up with yet another half-baked sports film Jada. Debutant filmmaker Kumaran has delivered a disappointing film with poorly written characters, shoddy screenplay and diametrically two opposite halves. While the first half revolves around 7s football, the director introduces horror elements in the second half and unfortunately both the genres are not justified". Firstpost wrote "Jada is a confused mess that lacks a proper script and narration and is neither a sports drama nor a horror thriller and falls between two stools". Indian Express wrote "what must have been a high-stakes emotional drama ends up as a dull genre-bender, because of the uninspired writing". Baradwaj Rangan of Film Companion South wrote "Whether pure genre or a mix, what matters is the writing. And that’s all over the place. The football itself is reduced to a lesser version of the game we saw in the first half…".

References

External links 
 

2010s sports films
2010s Tamil-language films
2019 films
2019 horror films
2019 directorial debut films
Films scored by Sam C. S.
Indian horror films
Indian sports films